Bullwinkle's Restaurant, also known as Family Fun Center, is a chain of family entertainment centers. Locations feature a sit-down restaurant, complemented by arcade games, go-karts, bumper boats, mini golf, laser tag, a ropes course, a zip line, and small rides for children. Games and activities are generally themed around the company's namesake, The Rocky and Bullwinkle Show.

Arcade 
Bullwinkle's features a card swipe and/or token-operated amusement arcade section featuring over 100 popular video games and redemption games, such as Teenage Mutant Ninja Turtles: Turtles in Time, The Simpsons  Game, Terminator 2: Judgment Day arcade game. More traditional arcade games, such as skeeball and basketball, are also available. Tickets can be redeemed for various prizes.

Restaurant 

The restaurant section of Bullwinkle's has a log cabin feel, inspired by the Dudley Do-Right cartoon. The restaurant's main fare usually includes pizza and burgers, as well as wraps and salads. The animatronic show featured the likes of Bullwinkle, Rocky, Boris Badenov, Natasha Fatale, Dudley Do-Right, Underdog, Tooter Turtle, Hoppity Hooper, and at one location Tennessee Tuxedo and Chumley, but nowadays only Bullwinkle, Rocky, and Boris and Natasha are featured. The music and dialog for the animated musicals were recorded by Bill Broughton, featuring reprisals from Bill Scott,  June Foray, and others being impersonation voices.

Locations 
Family Fun Center & Bullwinkle's Restaurant currently operates 2 known locations in the United States: in Wilsonville, Oregon and Tukwila, Washington. A third location re-opened in Upland, California on December 10, 2021 after being closed for 2 years.

Former locations

A location opened in Cary, NC in 1999-2000. An article announcing its opening at the time referenced existing restaurants in California, New York and Myrtle Beach, S.C. There also was a location in Richmond, VA in the 1980s.
There was a location in Edmonton, Alberta, Canada from 1984 to 1994.

Calgary, Alberta, Canada had a location on MacLeod Trail in the south of the city.

References

Further reading
 "Bullwinkle's food, games chain debuts full-service variant" Nation's Restaurant News, May 29, 2000.
 "Bullwinkle's braces for growth as Straw Hat agreement nears" Nation's Restaurant News, Sept 24, 1984 by Richard Martin.
 "'Moose and squirrel' to make Cary landing" Triangle Business Journal, Mar 29, 1999 by Adrianna Keener.

External links
Welcome to Family Fun Center and Bullwinkle's Restaurant!
International Association of Amusement Parks and Attractions

The Adventures of Rocky and Bullwinkle and Friends
Restaurants in Oregon
Restaurants in Washington (state)
Economy of the Northwestern United States
Regional restaurant chains in the United States
Pizza chains of the United States
Animatronic attractions
Theme restaurants
Video arcades
Amusement parks in Oregon

Amusement parks in Washington (state)